Helrunar is a German pagan metal band from Münster, founded in 2001. They played at the Summer Breeze Open Air in August 2007, and at the pagan metal Ragnarök Festival in 2008.

Line-up

Current members
 Skald Draugir – vocals (2001–present)
 Alsvartr – drums, guitar, bass (2001–present)

Former members
 Dionysos – guitar (2001–2008)

Discography
 Grátr (demo, 2003)
 Helrunar/Nachtmahr (split with the German band Nachtmahr, 2005)	
 Frostnacht (2005)
 Baldr ok íss (2007)
 Sól (2011)
 Fragments – A Mythological Excavation (split with Árstíðir Lífsins, 2012)
 Wein für Polyphem (2013)
 Niederkunfft (2015)
 Vanitas vanitatvm (2018)

References

External links
 
 Helrunar at Prophecy Productions

German black metal musical groups
Musical groups established in 2001
Viking metal musical groups